Marina Alekseyevna Mukabenova (born 20 March 1982) is a Russian politician. She formerly represented Kalmykia in the State Duma's seventh convocation. She was deputy chairman of the Duma's Committee on Information Policy, Information Technology and Communications.

See also 
 Results of the 2016 Russian legislative election by constituency
 List of members of the 7th Russian State Duma
List of members of the 7th Russian State Duma who were not re-elected

References 

Living people
1982 births
United Russia politicians
21st-century Russian politicians
21st-century Russian women politicians
Kalmyk people
Fifth convocation members of the State Duma (Russian Federation)
Sixth convocation members of the State Duma (Russian Federation)
Seventh convocation members of the State Duma (Russian Federation)
People from Kalmykia